Ottawa – Glandorf Local School District, is headquartered in eastern Putnam County, Ohio in the United States. The district serves students from the villages of Glandorf and Ottawa as well as parts of Blanchard, Greensburg, Liberty, Pleasant and Union Townships and all of Ottawa Township.

The Ottawa – Glandorf Local School District is the largest local school district in Putnam County, of which Ottawa is the county seat. The school district is located in Northwest Ohio, about one hour and fifteen minutes southwest of Toledo and a little over two hours southwest of Detroit.

Kevin Brinkman has been the superintendent of the school district since 2004. Brinkman will end his 10-year tenure as superintendent and will retire from his position on July 31, 2014. On May 17, 2014, the Ottawa-Glandorf school board hired Donald Horstman, superintendent of Kalida Local Schools, as its next superintendent. Horstman also previously served as Kalida High School principal and Glenwood Middle School (Findlay) assistant principal. He will assume his duties as superintendent on August 1.

Schools

Ottawa – Glandorf Local School District operates  the following schools:

High school
 Ottawa-Glandorf High School, in Ottawa (grades 9 through 12)

Elementary and Middle
 Ottawa Elementary School, in Ottawa (grades K through 8)
 Glandorf Elementary School, in Glandorf (grades K through 8)
 Sts. Peter and Paul Elementary School, in Ottawa (grades K through 8)

Preschool
 Titan TIKES Preschool, in Ottawa (Pre-K)
 Loving Care Learning Center, in Ottawa (Pre-K)
 Trinity Preschool, in Ottawa (Pre-K)
St. John the Baptist Catholic Preschool, in Glandorf (Pre-K)

Mascots
The Ottawa-Glandorf High School mascot, along with the Ottawa Elementary mascot, is the Titans and the Glandorf Elementary School mascot is the Dragons. The Sts. Peter and Paul Elementary mascot is the Knights. Before merging, Ottawa High School's mascot was the Indians.

Superintendent and School Board
Don Horstman is the superintendent of the Ottawa-Glandorf Local School District and has been since August 1, 2014.

, the members of the Ottawa-Glandorf School Board are:
 Becky Leader, President
 David Dalrymple, Vice President (elected in November 2015 election)
 Lucy Cramer (elected in November 2015 election)
 Beth Hempfling (elected in November 2015 election)
 Brent Schroeder (elected in November 2015 election)

Sports

The school district is and remains part of the Western Buckeye League of northwestern Ohio. The three elementary schools (grades 7-8) compete within the Putnam County League as separate schools. When consolidated together in some sports, they also compete within the Western Buckeye League. The Titans compete in the following sports:

 Basketball
 Cheerleading
 Football
 Cross Country
 Track
 Soccer
 Baseball
 Softball
 Golf
 Tennis
 Volleyball
 Wrestling
 Swimming
 Bowling

Athletes
1. Tim Pollitz 01-04 Miami (OH)
2. Eric Pollitz 01-04 Miami (OH)

WBL Championships

State Appearances

Recent Building Changes
The Ottawa-Glandorf High School was expanded and renovated in late 2004 and early 2005. This was Phase I of construction for the district.

In early May 2008, the Ohio School Facilities Commission advised Ottawa-Glandorf schools that the funding for Phase II of their building project is forthcoming. The Ottawa-Glandorf school board has decided to proceed with the master plan approved in 2002. This plan included the construction of two new elementary buildings.

The construction of the Ottawa building will be designed for 450 students and the Glandorf building for 500 students. The Ohio School Facilities Commission supports any building with a student population over 350 to be considered operationally efficient.

The school board hopes to have a bond levy on the November ballot.

External links

Schools in Ottawa-Glandorf Local School District from www.greatschools.net
U.S. Census Bureau: American Factfinder, Map of Ottawa-Glandorf Local School District Retrieved on July 31, 2006
Ottawa-Glandorf Local School District Punam County, Ohio Single Audit for the Year ended June 30, 2005

School districts in Ohio
Education in Putnam County, Ohio